According to the Organic Law of Regional Governments, the regions are, with the departments, the first-level administrative subdivisions of Peru. Since its 1821 independence, Peru had been divided into departments but faced the problem of increasing centralization of political and economic power in its capital, Lima. 

After several unsuccessful regionalization attempts, the national government decided to temporarily provide the departments (including the Constitutional Province of Callao) with regional governments until the conformation of regions according to the Organic Law of Regional Governments which says that two or more departments should merge to conform a region. This situation turned the departments into de facto regional government circumscriptions. The first regional governments were elected on November 20, 2002.

Under the new arrangement, the 24 departments plus the Callao Province are regional government circumscriptions each with a Regional Government. Lima Province, which has been excluded from this process and is not part of a regional government circumscription, has its own government institution: the Metropolitan Municipality of Lima.

Unlike the previous system, the regional circumscriptions have an elected government and have a wide array of responsibilities within their jurisdiction. Under the 2002 Organic Law of Regional Governments, there is an ongoing process of transfer of functions from the central government to the regions. A 2005 referendum for the merger of several departments failed to get the necessary electoral support.

Departments are subdivided into provinces and districts.

History
After declaring its independence in 1821, Peru was divided into departments, which grew in number from eleven in 1822 to twenty-four in 1980:

 Amazonas
 Ancash
 Apurímac
 Arequipa
 Ayacucho
 Cajamarca

 Cuzco
 Huancavelica
 Huánuco
 Ica
 Junín
 La Libertad

 Lambayeque
 Lima
 Loreto
 Madre de Dios
 Moquegua
 Pasco

 Piura
 Puno
 San Martin
 Tacna
 Tumbes
 Ucayali

As political and economic power increasingly concentrated in Lima, the capital city, several administrations attempted to decentralize the country with little success. The 1979 Peruvian Constitution contained provisions for the decentralization of power through the creation of autonomous regions, but they were not implemented. During the later years of the 1985–1990 presidency of Alan García, the government faced the prospect of losing the 1990 presidential elections because of a widespread economic crisis and faltering public support. As a way of creating an alternative source of power, the regime established twelve autonomous regions on January 20, 1989, in the hope of winning some elections at this level. However, due to the haste of their creation, these regional governments were not provided with fiscal resources of their own, so they depended on the goodwill of the central government for funding.

The 1990 presidential elections were marked by the discredit of political parties as evidenced in the election of Alberto Fujimori, an independent candidate. Fujimori withheld financial transfers to regional governments and then, on December 29, 1992, replaced them with government-designated Transitory Councils of Regional Administration. Having dissolved Congress in the 1992 Peruvian constitutional crisis, Fujimori called an election for a Constitutional Assembly which drafted the 1993 Constitution. This new text included provisions for the creation of regions with autonomous, elected governments, but they were not carried out. A framework law on decentralization issued on January 30, 1998, confirmed the permanence of transitory councils, now under the supervision of the Ministry of the Presidency.

Fujimori was forced to resign in November 2000 under accusations of authoritarianism, corruption, and human rights violations. After an interim government led by Valentín Paniagua, Alejandro Toledo was elected president for the 2001–2006 period on a platform that included creating regional governments. The new administration laid out the legal framework for the new administrative subdivisions in the Decentralization Bases Law, issued on July 17, 2002, and the Organic Law of Regional Governments issued on November 19, 2002. New regional governments were elected on November 20, 2002, one in each of the former departments and the former Constitutional Province of Callao. The province of Lima, containing the capital, was excluded from the process; thus, it is not part of any region.

In the 2002 elections, most regional governments went to parties in opposition, with twelve going to the APRA of Alan García and only one each to Possible Peru, the party of president Alejandro Toledo and ally Independent Moralizing Front of Fernando Olivera. The combination of a strong opposition and a weak government led to concerns about an impending political crisis. However, this did not turn out to be the case as the new regional governments were absorbed by local problems and showed little initiative in national politics. As the territorial circumscriptions that regional governments inherited from the former departments are considered too small, the Decentralization Bases Law provides for mergers between departments after a majority of the populations involved express their approval up to become a formal region. The first referendum of this kind was carried out on October 30, 2005, with the following proposals being put to the ballot:

 Apurímac, Cuzco
 Arequipa, Puno, Tacna
 Ayacucho, Huancavelica, Ica
 Ancash, Huánuco, Junín, Lima, Pasco
 Lambayeque, Piura, Tumbes

These proposals were rejected by the electorate of all departments involved except for Arequipa. Thus, no merger was carried out.

New elections for regional governments were held on November 19, 2006; most regions went to local political movements rather than to national parties. The APRA, which had won the presidential elections held on June 4, 2006, only won in two regions, all other national parties achieved even less.

Government

According to the Organic Law of Regional Governments, the responsibilities of regional governments include planning regional development, executing public investment projects, promoting economic activities, and managing public property. Regional governments are composed of a president and a council, elected for a four-year term; additionally, there is a coordination council integrated by provincial mayors and representatives of the civil society. The Regional President is the head of government; his functions include proposing and enforcing the budget, appointing government officials, issuing decrees and resolutions, executing regional plans and programs, and administering regional properties and rents. The Regional Council debates and votes upon bills proposed by the regional president, it also oversees all regional officials and can remove the president, its vice president, and any council member from office. The Regional Coordination Council has a consultancy role in planning and budget issues, and it has no executive or legislative powers.

The Organic Law of Regional Governments stipulates the gradual transfer of functions from the central government to the regions, provided they are certified as capable of undertaking these tasks. To oversee this process, the Decentralization Bases Law created a National Council of Decentralization. However, this institution was criticized for being bureaucratic and ineffective by the government of Alan García, former president of Peru. Thus, on January 24, 2007, the council was abolished and replaced by the Decentralization Secretariat, a dependency of the Prime Minister office. Two months later, the regional presidents gathered in the city of Huánuco established a National Assembly of Regional Governments as an alternative coordinating institution, independent from the Central Government.

Regions 
Area and population information on the following list has been retrieved from official data by the Peruvian National Institute of Statistics and Informatics (INEI). Areas are rounded to the nearest whole unit. Demographic data is based on the 2023 Census carried out from 2022 to 2023. Population density is given to one decimal place in persons per square kilometer. UBIGEO numbers are codes used by INEI to identify national administrative subdivisions.

Former departments

See also
 Administrative divisions of Peru
 Districts of Peru
 ISO 3166-2:PE
 Provinces of Peru
 List of regions of Peru by population
 List of Peruvian regions by GDP

Notes

References
 BBC News. Fujimori: Decline and fall. November 20, 2000.
 . March 20, 2007.
 . January 24, 2007.
  Instituto Nacional de Estadística e Informática. Banco de Información Distrital.
 . July 17, 2002.
  . November 16, 2002.
  Monge, Carlos. "Los gobiernos regionales del periodo 2003–2006: la primera promoción que se gradúa de la descentralización". Quehacer 163: 33–36 (November–December 2006).
  Oficina Nacional de Procesos Electorales, Elecciones Regionales y Municipales 2006.
  Oficina Nacional de Procesos Electorales, Referendum para la Integracion y Conformacion de Regiones 2005.
  Oficina Nacional de Procesos Electorales. Resultados regionales.
 O'Neill, Kathleen. Decentralizing the State: elections, parties, and local power in the Andes. Cambridge: Cambridge University Press, 2005.
 Schönwälder, Gerd. Linking civil society and the State: urban popular movements, the Left and local government in Perú, 1980–1992. Pennsylvania: The Pennsylvania State University Press, 2002.
 The New York Times. "Opposition Party Makes Strong Showing in Peru Election". November 18, 2002.

Subdivisions of Peru
Peru, Regions
Regions, Peru
Peru geography-related lists

da:Peru#Regioner
pl:Peru#Podział administracyjny